Roy Díaz González  (born 1953) is a former world-class badminton player from Mexico. Something of a child prodigy in the sport, González began touring internationally at fourteen, the age at which he captured the first of his many Mexican national singles titles. He won the Belgian International men's doubles title at fifteen and the Swiss Open men's singles title at sixteen. By his late teens, in the early 1970s, González was competitive with the world's best players, but he never developed the penetrating power, or the deceptive wizardry, which might have allowed him to break through in badminton's biggest events. Nevertheless, he remained a respected and dangerous opponent on the world scene for over a decade, admired for his footwork, stamina, and touch. In 1977 he won men's singles at the first ever Pan-American Badminton Championships. González played in five Thomas Cup (men's international team) campaigns for Mexico, between 1970 and 1984, before finally losing a Thomas Cup singles match to another North American player. His advisor at the court was for a long time his father Dr. Jorge Díaz González.

References

Mexican male badminton players
1953 births
Living people